Bria Holmes (born April 19, 1994) is an American professional basketball player who is a free agent in the Women's National Basketball Association (WNBA). She was drafted with the eleventh overall pick in the 2016 WNBA draft.  Holmes was the fifth player to be drafted from West Virginia.

College career
Holmes was rated the #1 player in Connecticut by ESPN in the 2012 recruiting class.  Over her four years at West Virginia, Holmes scored 2,001 points.  She is only the fourth player to reach the 2,000 point mark in Mountaineer history.  She averaged 14.5 points per game and 3.5 rebounds per game at West Virginia.  Holmes finished her career as the third highest scorer in Mountaineer history, and became only the second Mountaineer to receive all conference first team honors in three straight years.  Holmes also finished with three straight years of scoring 500 or more points.  The Mountaineers made the NCAA Tournament in three out of the four years Holmes was on the team.  In the 2013–14 season, the Mountaineers won the Big 12 regular season title.

West Virginia statistics

Source

WNBA career
Holmes was drafted in the first round, with the eleventh overall pick in the 2016 WNBA draft by the Atlanta Dream.  In her first season, Holmes started 10 games and played in 32 with the Dream.  She averaged 7.5 points per game and 2.6 rebounds per game.  In 2017, Holmes played in all 32 games for the Dream again and started 13.  She improved her points per game to 7.8.  Prior to the 2018 season, Holmes was traded to the Connecticut Sun for a second round pick in the 2018 WNBA draft and a second round pick in the 2019 WNBA draft.  Prior to this trade, Holmes had announced that she would miss the 2018 season due to pregnancy.

References

External links
West Virginia Mountaineers bio
WNBA bio

1994 births
Living people
American women's basketball players
Atlanta Dream draft picks
Atlanta Dream players
Connecticut Sun players
Las Vegas Aces players
Los Angeles Sparks players
Shooting guards
Sportspeople from New Haven, Connecticut
West Virginia Mountaineers women's basketball players